Jean Baptiste de la Barrière (1544–1600) was a religious figure. He was the commendatory abbot of Les Feuillants Abbey at the age of 19, and founder of the reformed Cistercian order that arose there, the Feuillants. During his life he became a spiritual adviser to King Henry III of France.  During 1587 Henry III built a monastery for the Feuillants to commemorate his friendship with Jean.

Jean lived a patient, compassionate life and adopted routines such as sleeping on the floor with a stone pillow and eating without tables. Jean did not eat fish or eggs, nor did he allow his followers to do so.  The Feuillants used herbs for sacred rituals.

A couple of Jean's followers attempted to assassinate him via poison, but he survived.

After the assassination of Henri III, Jean de la Barrière was forced into lay communion by the church. However, this did not last long. With the help of his friend Countess Catherine Nobili Sforza, he was reinstated. Jean died soon after in the arms of his friend Cardinal Arnaud d'Ossat during the year 1600.

After his death Jean's heart was kept and preserved by the church. He received the first degree of Sanctity from the Roman Catholic church and was given the title of Venerable.

1554 births
1600 deaths